Make it on Time is Rawlins Cross' sixth and final album.

Track listing
"Boogieland"
"Crossroad"
"Near Dearly Departed"
"You Will Always Have My Love"
"Make It on Time"
"Some People"
"Where Would I Be"
"French Painter"/"Drive'er Down"
"Don't Wait on Me"
"Rockaway"
"Two Islands"
"Deep Blue"
"Navvy on the Line"/"Jim Hodder's Reel"
"Winter's Tale"

1998 albums
Rawlins Cross albums